Solange Franklin Reed (née Franklin) is an American fashion stylist. She has worked as an independent stylist since 2015 and her work includes editorial, runway, and celebrity styling. She was named an inaugural New Wave: Creative at the 2019 Fashion Awards.

Early life and education 
Born Solange Franklin, she was raised in Des Moines, Iowa. Both of her parents are physicians. She loved fashion from childhood and frequently read magazines such as Honey. She named Missy Elliott, Lauryn Hill, and Aaliyah as early fashion inspirations. Franklin enjoyed shopping at thrift stores and would take clothing from her older sister's closet. An avid reader of fashion blogs, they were the catalyst for her considering a career in the industry.

Franklin attended Mount Holyoke College and initially enrolled as a pre-med student, then created her own major in race, gender, and health relations before switching to African American studies. She held an internship in the marketing department at Teen Vogue during college.

Career 
Franklin Reed's fashion career begin with an internship at Essence and then she worked a salaried position at Teen Vogue. She later began to freelance jobs and worked assisting stylists. For over four years Franklin Reed was the first assistant for fashion editor Giovanna Battaglia, whom she also considers a mentor. She also worked for Paper as editor-at-lage.

Franklin Reed has been an independent stylist since 2015, and her work includes editorials, runway styling, advertising, and celebrity styling. Franklin Reed emphasizes creatives who are Black, women, curvy, and from other underrepresented communities.

She has worked with Serena Williams, Whoopi Goldberg, Solange Knowles, Mary J. Blige, Tracee Ellis Ross, Zazie Beetz, and Kerry Washington, among others. Her work was recommended by Pause and Editorialist.

Other work 
She was a speaker at the 2017 Women's March in New York City. After styling the first troop of homeless Girl Scouts for Teen Vogue, Franklin Reed became a troop leader.

Personal life 
She married journalist Brian Franklin Reed (né Reed), host of S-Town, in October 2015. They met through a mutual friend. The two had to appear in court to win the legal right to change their last name to "Franklin Reed" without hyphenating or merging the names.

They reside in Brooklyn, New York and have one child (b. 2020).

Accolades 
 2019 - The Fashion Awards, The New Wave: Creatives, British Fashion Council

References

External links 
 Official website

Year of birth missing (living people)
Living people
Fashion stylists
21st-century African-American women
21st-century African-American people
Mount Holyoke College alumni
People from Des Moines, Iowa
Fashion editors